Fuentelarreina is an administrative neighborhood of Madrid belonging to the district of Fuencarral-El Pardo.

Wards of Madrid
Fuencarral-El Pardo